Hélène et les Garçons (Helen and the Boys) is a French television sitcom that aired from 1992 to 1994. It is a spin-off from the series First Kisses, and follows Hélène Girard and her friends in their life as students.

It was created in 1992 by Jean-Luc Azoulay. Hélène, the main character, is performed by the actress Hélène Rollès who is also a famous singer in France.

Synopsis
Hélène shares her college room with Cathy and Johanna. One day, the three friends meet three young men, who share a college room and play in a rock band together. Hélène and her friends will know love and heartaches, laughs and drinks.

Detailed plot
In the first episode three young girl students meet three boy musicians. The series deals with love, friendship, betrayal, sadness, joy. Over the episodes, the actors and their roles grow. In 1994, the series The Miracle of Love takes over. The merry band leaves the hospice room and rents a large house together.

The departure of the central actors Hélène Rollès (Helen) and Patrick Puydebat (Nicolas) caused a loss of audience. A replacement was then proposed for Helen and the Boys. So Les vacances de l'amour (The holidays of love) began in 1996 and lasted until 2004, with 160 episodes aired. The format of the series goes to 52 minutes and left the studios of the plain of St. Denis and cardboard sets. Natural scenery and rich in the fictitious island of Love Island in the Caribbean. The band goes on vacation for three weeks and will find Nicolas who was exiled there. Eventually they will all move there. Helen will also be returning. But also detective stories and endless surprises.

In 2010, Helen and her boys were back in the new series Mysteries of Love (Les Mystères de l'amour).

Despite negative reviews from critics, it was successful in the 1990s in both France and Scandinavia.

External links
 

1990s college television series
1990s French comedy television series
1990s teen sitcoms
1992 French television series debuts
1994 French television series endings
French television sitcoms
TF1 original programming